This list contains all ordinary members of Teylers Eerste Genootschap (Teylers First Society). The total number of members varies over time. Appointments were for life, although the members can resign. At 1955 it became customary to resign at age 70, but to remain extraordinary members. Extraordinary members are not indicated. The years indicate their membership.

Original appointed members 
The members appointed by testament of Pieter Teyler van der Hulst:

 Age Wijnalda (1778 - 1792)
 Cornelis Loosjes (1778 - 1792)
 Klaas van der Horst (1778 - 1825)
 Jan Verbeek (1778 - 1788)
 Barend Hartman van Groningen (1778 - 1806)

Later members 

 Frederik Scheltinga (1778 - 1781)
 Jan van Walré (1781 - 1782)
 Willem van Kampen (1782 - 1783)
 Willem Brouwer Bosch (1783 - 1788)
 Petrus Loosjes Adz (1788 - 1813)
 Abraham Wijnands (1788 - 1805)
 Cornelis de Vries (1792 - 1812)
 Cornelis de Haan (1792 - 1793)
 Matthias van Geuns Jz (1793 - 1839)
 Abraham de Vries (1805 - 1862)
 François Huurkamp van der Vinne (1807 - 1815)
 Sybren Klazes Sybrandi (1812 - 1827), resigned to become director
 Adriaan Loosjes Pzn (1813 - 1818)
 Rinse Koopman (1815 - 1826)
 Matthijs Siegenbeek (1818 - 1854)
 Samuel Muller (1825 - 1875)
 Jan van Geuns (1826 - 1831), resigned
 Louis Philip Serrurier (1827 - 1844)
 Sytse Klaas de Waard (1832 - 1856)
 Klaas Sybrandi (1839 - 1858), resigned to become director
 Willem Carel Mauve (1844 - 1869)
 Jan van Gilse (1854 - 1859)
 Abraham Kuenen (1856 - 1891)
 Sytse Hoekstra Bzn (1858 - 1893), resigned
 Christiaan Sepp (1859 - 1890)
 Dirk Harting (1862 - 1889), resigned
 Hendrik Arend van Gelder (1869 - 1899)
 Jacob Giesbert de Hoop Scheffer (1875 - 1893)
 Cornelis Petrus Tiele (1889 - 1902)
 Samuel Cramer (1890 - 1913)
 Johannes Gerardus Rijk Acquoy (1892 - 1896)
 Izaak Jan de Bussy (1893 - 1911), resigned
 Jan Gerrit Boekenoogen (1894 - 1932), resigned
 Daniël E. J. Völter (1897 - 1927)
 Arnoldus Cornelis Duker (1899 - 1915)
 Hendrik Jan Elhorst (1902 - 1924)
 Pierre Henri Ritter (1912 - 1912)
 Pieter Feenstra (1913 - 1936)
 Albert Bruining (1913 - 1920)
 Tjeerd Cannegieter (1915 - 1927), resigned
 Hajo Uden Meyboom (1920 - 1932), resigned
 Johan Gerrit Appeldoorn (1924 - 1942), resigned
 Arjen Binnerts (1927 - 1932)
 Heinrich Friedrich Hackmann (1927 - 1934), resigned
 Wilhelmus Johannes Kühler (1932 - 1946)
 Cornelis Bonnes Hylkema (1932 - 1941), resigned
 Gustaaf Adolf van den Bergh van Eysinga (1933 - 1957)
 William Brede Kristensen (1934 - 1951)
 Jan Nicolaas Bakhuizen van den Brink (1936 - 1966)
 Albertus Wilhelmus Groenman (1942 - 1961)
 Willem Leendertz (1942 - 1961)
 Willem Frederik Golterman (1946 - 1968)
 Adriaan de Buck (1951 - 1959)
 Johannes Arnoldus Oosterbaan (1957 - ?)
 Jan Nicolaas Sevenster (1959 - 1971)
 Martinus Adrianus Beek (1961 - ?)
 Jan Zandzee (1961 - ?)
 Willem Frederik Dankbaar (1967 - 1977)
 Irvin Buckwalter Horst (1968 - ?)
 Marinus de Jonge (1971 - ?)
 Hendrik Bernardus Kossen (1978 - ?)

References
 Teyler 1778-1978:studies en bijdragen over Teylers Stichting naar aanleiding van het tweede eeuwfeest, by J. H. van Borssum Buisman, H. Enno van Gelder, Pieter Teyler van der Hulst, Schuyt, 1978, 

Lists of Dutch people